Karamjeet Singh Judge VC (25 May 1923 – 18 March 1945) was an Indian recipient of the Victoria Cross, the highest and most prestigious award for gallantry in the face of the enemy that can be awarded to British and Commonwealth forces.

Early life 
His father was chief of police at Kapurthala.  Karamjeet was a member of the Indian National Congress Party.  He regarded his brother Ajeet Singh Judge as a patriot for joining the Royal Indian Artillery.   He seems to have been persuaded to join the army rather than continue political studies at Lahore College.   Thus he enrolled for Officer Training School, Bangalore.  He opted to join the Pioneer corps to get near the Burma front-line.  At his brother's written request, he was accepted by 15th Punjab Regiment.

Army career
He was commissioned as an infantry subaltern at Ambala, before transfer to 39th Indian Division Nearing an important moment in the war, when the Allies were about to launch the largest counter-offensive of the war so far, he arrived with 4th Battalion into the British 14th Army to make the drive for Rangoon.

General Slim's masterful strategy was simple: to divide the Japanese forces on a railway junction at Meiktila.  The ensuing battles were among the most savage and bitter of the Second World War.  The brilliant thrust captured the garrison town that controlled the crossing over the Irrawaddy River.  The Japanese launched a series of counter-attacks to desperately try to keep the road to Mandalay open for their retreat.  Myingyan became an important river-head supply base.

4/15th were part of Lt-Col Hubert Conroy's 33 Brigade whose job was to clear the forest in a triangle around Nyaunga bridgehead.  South of Nyaunga they attacked Sindewa, a heavily defended Japanese position in the jungle, thick with trees.  There were extensive minefields.

On 18 March 1945 during the Battle of Meiktila in Burma (now Myanmar), he was ordered to capture a cotton mill.  The assault began with an attack on the strategic river port of Myingan.  By all accounts even before receiving the posthumous award, Singh was a brave soldier.  Always eager to engage in actions he confided in C/O 4/15th Major Johnny Whitmarsh-Knight his desire for glory.   They arrived on 17 March 1945.  The following morning the Jat Company comprising Indian soldiers was to spearhead the assault.  They were supported by the Sherman tanks of No 2 Troop, C Squadron, 116 Regiment (Gordon Highlanders), Royal Armoured Corps, commanded by Lt Hugh Baker.

Singh was just 21 years old, and a Lieutenant in the 4th Battalion, 15th Punjab Regiment, in the British Indian Army during World War II when he performed the following deeds for which he was awarded the VC during the Battle of Myingan which raged over four days. Baker exclaimed later that Karamjeet was the "bravest soldier I have ever seen."

Though facing stiff enemy resistance (a total of almost 200 enemy shells fell around the tanks and infantry during the attack) and in unsuitable terrain for tanks, he dominated the battlefield by his numerous and successive acts of superb gallantry until he fell in the last stages of the action.

The citation reads:

References

Bibliography
 Britain at War: A History of Conflict: History Monthly, issue 102, October 2015, p.68-74

Sikh warriors
1945 deaths
Indian World War II recipients of the Victoria Cross
British Indian Army officers
Indian Army personnel killed in World War II
1923 births
People from Kapurthala